Palakollu Municipality is the local self-government in Palakollu of the Indian state of Andhra Pradesh. Palakollu Municipality merged five Grama panchayats of Seven village's (Kontheru, Adavipalem, Palakollu Rural, Bhaggeswaram, Poolapalli, Varidhanam And Ullamparru) on dated 7 January 2020. the Seven Village's population of 42,932 (as 2011 Census) It around occupies  and after merged palakollu municipality It around occupies  with 35 election wards it is total population of 1,04,216 (as 2011 Census) and making it the fourth most populous city in West Godavari District in Andhra Pradesh. It is classified as a Selection Grade Municipality.

1 January 2019, under Andhra Pradesh Metropolitan Region and Urban Development Authority Act, 2016, Palakollu Municipality became a part of Eluru Urban Development Authority.

Administration 

The municipality was formed in April 1919 as a Grade–III municipality. Over the years, it was upgraded and was constituted finally as a First Grade Municipality in September 1965. The first ever elected council was formed in August 1919.

Each is represented by a ward member and the wards committee is headed by a chairperson. The present municipal commissioner of the city is Sri K.Sai Ram.

Timeline

Civic infrastructure and services 
The municipality takes certain measures such as prevent spreading of diseases, motor pumping of stagnant flood water during heavy rains, and improving drainage channels and pipelines.

Responsibilities 
PMC is responsible for administering and providing basic infrastructure to the city.
 Building and maintenance of roads, streets and flyovers
 Public municipal schools
 Street lighting
 Maintenance of parks and open spaces
 Garbage disposal and street cleanliness
 Urban development and city planning of new areas
 Registering of births and deaths
 Health and sanitation

PMC co-ordinates with various other government organizations like EUDA, APSRTC and Palakollu Traffic Police, to deliver these basic urban services.

Palakollu municipal election 2014

Awards and achievements 
In 2018, as per the Swachh Bharat Mission of the Ministry of Urban Development, Under Swachh Survekshan - 2018 Palakollu Municipality was ranked 43rd in the South Zone out of 1113 with Zonal average marks 1438.96 and state rank 20th out of 79 with state average marks 1916.2 Palakollu ULB Census Coad 802966.

See also 
 List of municipalities in Andhra Pradesh

References 

Palakollu
1919 establishments in India
Government agencies established in 1919
Municipal Councils in Andhra Pradesh
Buildings and structures in Palakollu